Kahn-e Kahur (also Romanized as Kahn-e Kahūr and Kahn Kahoor) is a village in Zaboli Rural District, in the Central District of Mehrestan County, Sistan and Baluchestan Province, Iran. At the 2006 census, its population was 320, in 67 families.

References 

Populated places in Mehrestan County